Strensko is a settlement in the Municipality of Laško in eastern Slovenia. It lies on the left bank of the Savinja River, opposite Rimske Toplice. The railway line from Zidani Most to Celje runs through the settlement. The area is part of the traditional region of Styria. It is now included with the rest of the municipality in the Savinja Statistical Region.

References

External links
Strensko on Geopedia

Populated places in the Municipality of Laško